Frank Jordan (19 September 1905 – 22 October 1995) was an Australian cricketer. He played six first-class matches for New South Wales between 1927/28 and 1928/29.

See also
 List of New South Wales representative cricketers

References

External links
 

1905 births
1995 deaths
Australian cricketers
New South Wales cricketers
Cricketers from Sydney